Velykyi Bychkiv is an urban-type settlement in Rakhiv Raion (district) of Zakarpattia Oblast (province) in western Ukraine. It belongs to Velykyi Bychkiv settlement hromada, one of the hromadas of Ukraine. Population:

History
The village was first mentioned in 1358, by the name Buchku. Its name is derived from a Slavic word meaning "bull". Before 1556 Bosckai family owned the village. From 1556 it belonged to the Báthory family. By 1711 a mansion already stood here. After the failed revolution led by Francis II Rákóczi, Germans settled in the area. The village had three parts: Nagybocskó and Kisbocskó ("Greater" and "Smaller" Bocskó), which form today's Velykyy Bychkiv, and Németbocskó ("German Bocskó") across the river (this forms today's Bocicoiu Mare in Romania).

In 1910 the village had 5955 inhabitants: 3078 Ruthenians, 1646 Hungarians and 1177 Germans by the primary language,  or 3374 Greek Catholic, 1266 Roman Catholic and 1163 Jewish people by religion.  It belonged to the Hungarian county of Máramaros. After World War I it belonged to Czechoslovakia, then since 1939 again became part of Hungary, before being ceded to the Ukrainian SSR in 1945.

Velykiy Bychkiv has a chemical, sulfuric acid and table salt factory, as well as a sawmill. In 1930 a forest railway line was built. Velykiy Bychkiv was accorded the current urban-type settlement status in 1947.

People from Velykyi Bychkiv
 János Balogh, biologist, member of the Hungarian Academy of Sciences, was born here on February 19, 1903.
 Ottó Korvin, politician, a founder of the Communist Workers' Party, was born here on March 24, 1894.
 Theodore Romzha, Greek Catholic bishop of Mukačevo, was born here on April 14, 1911.
 Ivan Yaremchuk, soviet football player, was born here on September 13, 1962
 Marija Tkachuk, vc'itel'ka v seli Ruske(Ruskoj)Slovakia
 Julia Jusupc'ak, vc'itel'ka v seli Ruske(Ruskoj) Slovakia

See also
 Kobyletska Poliana and Yasinia, the other two urban-type settlements in Rakhiv Raion of Zakarpattia Oblast

References

External links
 History of Velykyy Bychkiv from  Velykyy Bychkiv official web-site. 
 Velykyy Bychkiv, at Ukrainian Verkhovna Rada portal 
 This article is based on a translation of the equivalent article from the Hungarian Wikipedia on 19 February 2007.

Urban-type settlements in Rakhiv Raion